The Ministry of State for Local Governance was a ministerial post of the Albanian Government responsible for Local Governance and Territorial Administrative Reform.

Officeholders (2013–2017)

See also
 Municipalities of Albania

References

Local Governance
Ministries established in 2013